State Highway 347 (SH 347) is a Texas state highway that runs northwest from Port Arthur to the southern edge of Beaumont. The highway is signed south–north. It was designated on November 25, 1942 along the old route of US 69.

Route description
SH 347 begins at SH 87 in Port Arthur. The highway heads northwest, crossing SH 73, Spur 136 and FM 365. SH 347 then enters Nederland and has a junction with FM 366. Continuing northwest, the highway enters Beaumont and ends at US 69/US 96/US 287 in the southern end of the city at Spur 380 ( Martin Luther King Jr. Parkway)

Junction list

References

347
Transportation in Jefferson County, Texas
U.S. Route 69